Lycomorpha grotei, or Grote's lycomorpha moth, is a moth of the family Erebidae. It was described by Alpheus Spring Packard in 1864. It is found in North America, including Arizona, California, Colorado, Montana, Nevada, South Dakota, Texas, Utah and Wyoming.

Adults are on wing from June to August in one generation per year.

Subspecies
Lycomorpha grotei grotei
Lycomorpha grotei pulchra Dyar, 1898

References

Cisthenina
Moths described in 1864